Secrets is a 1983 British comedy film directed by Gavin Millar and produced by David Puttnam. It was originally shown as part of Puttnam's Channel 4 anthology series First Love.

Plot 
In the fall of 1963, Louise is a 13-year-old girl who lives with her widowed mother. Before she is set to leave for boarding school, she discovers a box belonging to her late father. The box contains secret documents in additions to condoms, but Louise thinks they are balloons. She also learns her father was a member of the secret order of Freemasons. While at boarding school, Louise attempts to explain to friends what the Freemasons are. The girls form their own version of a Masonic club. Meanwhile, Louise’s mother finds the box in Louise’s room and inadvertently thinks her daughter is sexually active. Louise learns her parents’ marriage was not what she thought it was.

Production
Goldcrest Films invested £461,000 in the movie and received £620,000 earning them a profit of £159,000.

Cast
Helen Lindsay as Mother
John Horsley as Dr. Jefferies
Anna Jones as Louise
Daisy Cockburn as Sydney
Rebecca Johnson as Trottie
Lucy Goode as Jane
Richard Tolan as Paul
Carol Gillies as Miss Quick
Jane Briers as Miss Strickland
Judith Fellows as Elderly Teacher
Georgine Anderson as Matron
Cynthia Grenville as Miss Johnson
Elizabeth Choice as Miss Jones Wallace
Matyelok Gibbs as Miss Lane

Reception 
In a review of the film, the Santa Cruz Sentinel wrote Secrets is "not large enough to fill a movie screen in any way, shape or form ... but it is kind of sweet". Rebecca Lieb of The Film Journal called the film "a light, entertaining, and often very funny comedy...enhanced with an acute sense of what it's like to be 13 and discovering sex".

References

External links

Secrets at Goldcrest Films
Secrets at Letterboxd

1983 television films
1983 films
Films directed by Gavin Millar
1983 comedy films
Films set in 1963
British teen comedy films
1980s coming-of-age comedy films
1980s teen comedy films
Films about puberty
Films set in boarding schools
1980s English-language films
1980s British films